Nigel Ellsay (born 30 April 1994 in Courtenay, British Columbia) is a Canadian former professional cyclist, who rode professionally between 2015 and 2020, for the  and  teams. In 2018, Ellsay won bronze at the Canadian National Road Race Championships.

Major results

2011
 2nd Time trial, National Junior Road Championships
2012
 1st  Time trial, National Junior Road Championships
2013
 9th Tour de Delta
2014
 2nd Time trial, National Under-23 Road Championships
 7th White Spot / Delta Road Race
2016
 2nd Overall Joe Martin Stage Race
 7th Overall Tour of Alberta
2017
 1st  Mountains classification Tour de Beauce
 2nd Time trial, National Road Championships
 7th Overall Cascade Cycling Classic
 7th Overall Joe Martin Stage Race
 10th Overall Tour of Alberta
2018
 3rd Road race, National Road Championships
2019
 2nd Road race, National Road Championships
 9th Overall Tour de Beauce

References

External links

1994 births
Living people
Canadian male cyclists
Cyclists from British Columbia
People from Courtenay, British Columbia